Wheatley Hills and Intake is a ward in the metropolitan borough of Doncaster, South Yorkshire, England.  The ward contains three listed buildings that are recorded in the National Heritage List for England.  All the listed buildings are designated at Grade II, the lowest of the three grades, which is applied to "buildings of national importance and special interest".  The ward contains the suburbs of Wheatley Hills and Intake, to the northeast of the centre of Doncaster.  The listed buildings consist of two pairs of semi-detached houses, and a grandstand at Doncaster Racecourse.


Buildings

References

Citations

Sources

 

Lists of listed buildings in South Yorkshire